Salhøa is a mountain in Dovrefjell–Sunndalsfjella National Park in Norway. Other nearby mountains include Skuleggen to the east, Drugshøi to the southeast, and Lågvasstinden to the southwest.

See also
List of mountains of Norway

References

Mountains of Innlandet
Mountains of Møre og Romsdal
Sunndal
Lesja